Nemetali Ogražden is a defunct basketball club based in Strumica, North Macedonia. They played in the Macedonian First League until the season 2003/2004. In 2004 the club declared bankruptcy because of financial problems.

Domestic achievements
 Macedonian League Semi-finalist - 2004
 Macedonian Cup Finalist - 2004

Former players

 Vlado Ilievski
 Petar Nastev
 Stojan Madžunkov
 Risto Duganov
 Dimče Gaštarski
 Eftim Bogoev
 Antonio Minevski
 Goce Andrevski
 Toni Grnčarov
 Tomčo Sokolov
 Zoran Nikolov
 Borče Domlevski
 Marjan Ilievski
 Milorad Kmezić
 Predrag Joksimović
 Njegoš Abazović

Former coaches
 Jordančo Davitkov

Rivalries
 KK Nemetali Ogražden in the past had traditional rivalry games with Makedonija 91.

References

External links
 FIBA Profile
 Nemetali Ograzden Profile
 Кошаркарско дерби Неметали Огражден и Македонија 91
 Eurobasket Profile

Basketball teams in North Macedonia
Basketball teams established in 1949
Basketball teams disestablished in 2004
1949 establishments in the Socialist Republic of Macedonia
2004 disestablishments in the Republic of Macedonia